Patrick J. Scott (December 25, 1848 – October 22, 1899) was a lawyer and political figure in Newfoundland. He represented St. John's West in the Newfoundland and Labrador House of Assembly from 1872 to 1882, from 1885 to 1889 and from 1894 to 1897.

He was born in St. John's and educated at Saint Bonaventure's College. He studied law with George James Hogsett and John Little and was admitted to the Newfoundland bar in 1874. Scott married Eleanor Margaret Little, the sister of Joseph Ignatius Little, in 1882. He was defeated when he ran for reelection in 1889 and in 1893 and in an 1890 by-election in St. John's East. He was elected again in an 1894 by-election held after several Liberals elected in 1893 were forced to resign. Scott was named to the Executive Council as receiver general in 1894. He was defeated when he chose to run in Placentia and St. Mary's in the 1897 general election. He died in St. John's of heart failure at the age of 50.

References 

Members of the Newfoundland and Labrador House of Assembly
1848 births
1899 deaths
Newfoundland Colony people
Members of the Executive Council of Newfoundland and Labrador